Senator Dane may refer to:

Joseph Dane (1778–1858), Maine State Senate
Nathan Dane (1752–1835), Massachusetts State Senate